Protest Warrior is a defunct conservative political activist group. It was formed in 2003 by Alan Lipton and Kfir Alfia in Austin, Texas. The group is primarily known for organizing counter-protests in favor of the Iraq war. Its slogan is "Fighting the left...doing it right". As of 2015, it was inactive.

History
In February 2003, Alfia was working as a computer chip designer in San Francisco when he reunited with Alan Lipton, a childhood friend, and crashed an anti-war protest in San Francisco on February 16, 2003.

The two carried their own signs. Alfia's sign showed a woman in a burqa tied to a pole with a leash around her neck, and was captioned "Protect Islamic Property Rights Against Western Imperialism. Say No To War!" Lipton's sign said, "Saddam Only Kills His Own People. It's None Of Our Business." Conservative talk-show host Rush Limbaugh covered their counter-protest on his website and complimented the group on its work.

Motivation
Seeing liberals as "morally and politically bankrupt," and as having a monopoly of media attention, Protest Warrior believes that the voices of the "left" are "heard disproportionately, demoralizing our troops and emboldening dictators around the world."

Method 
The group's primary method of activism is crashing liberal events, chiefly anti-war protest marches and counter-demonstrating within their ranks. For instance, Protest Warriors attended rallies against Halliburton, Caterpillar Inc., Israel, and U.S. President George W. Bush, displaying support for these entities. When doing so, the Protest Warriors carry large signs often designed to appear similar to those held by the participants, enabling them to mingle until observers are close enough to read their signs' fine-print.

Website

The group maintains a website as an organizing and information hub. It also acts as a source for the many slogans and signs presented by Protest Warriors at protests, as well as offering a sign creation tutorial to registered members. The website also includes an online shop. The website also featured numerous forums, but they were shut down without explanation  on September 13, 2006, and currently return a HTTP 404 error.

The website has been the target of various attempts at politically motivated hacking in the course of its existence. Most notably, in January, 2005 the site was hacked by Chicago native Jeremy Hammond, affiliated with the website HackThisSite.org, to steal credit card numbers and shut down the web server. Hammond was indicted in May, 2006,  and sentenced to two years in prison on December 7, 2006.

Past operations
Local and National chapters of Protest Warrior have carried out operations in the United States and abroad. Examples of past Protest Warrior operations include:

On January 20, 2005, "Operation Hail to the Chief" drew thirteen Protest Warriors to Washington D.C. to oppose those protesting the second inauguration of President George W. Bush.
During the 2004 Republican National Convention, a group of Protest Warriors staged a counterprotest, "Operation Liberty Rising".
On August 27, 2005, a group of three Protest Warriors led by co-founder Kfir Alfia was the target of animosity at a conservative counter-Cindy Sheehan rally in Crawford, Texas. Despite the Protest Warriors' assurances that they were on the same side, the conservative protesters repeatedly shouted at them, destroyed the Protest Warrior signs, and forced the Protest Warriors to leave the rally, mistaking them for anti-war protesters.
During the Sept. 24, 2005 Anti-War Protests in Washington D.C., Protest Warrior, along with Move America Forward, RightMarch and Free Republic counter-protested those opposed to the war, and also demonstrated in support of the war and troops.

Current status, future campaigns 
The current status of Protest Warrior is unknown:

 "ProtestWarrior, LLC", formed as a limited liability company in Texas in 2003, is currently listed by the state as "Not In Good Standing", meaning that Protest Warrior has failed to file its annual paperwork and pay due taxes/fees.
 The main discussion forums for PW closed in September 2006. The public forums were reopened in August 2007 and then subsequently went offline again sometime in 2008.
 On February 21, 2007 a blog was started, announcing a "Protest Warrior 2.0" initiative aimed at revitalizing the organization. Seven articles were written over the span of seven months, with the last entry being dated August 15, 2007. 
 On February 19, 2009 the website was offline again and then returned three months later. The website is currently accessible, but the discussion forums, donation solicitation page, and "HQ" sections are either non-functional or have been entirely removed (HTTP Error 404). The latest "News & Updates" section announces a book publication in June, 2007.

See also
 Civil disobedience

References

External links
 archive.org mirror of Protest Warrior Site
 MSNBC: "Partisan Protesters" Newsweek, 2004-08-13
 Washington Times: "Protest Warriors fuel rage on left" The Washington Times, 2004-08-24
 Protesting The Protesters, The Washington Post, 2005-01-20
 Protest "Warriors" or Protest Losers?? Mar 02, 2005

2003 establishments in Texas
Conservative political advocacy groups in the United States
Organizations based in Texas
Organizations established in 2003
Political Internet forums